The Bundesstraße 431 (or B 431) is a German federal main street running in a Northwest to Southeast direction from Meldorf to the Altona borough of Hamburg.

See also 
 Transport in Hamburg

External links 

431